The Netherlands held a national final to select the two entrants that Nederlandse Televisie Stichting (NTS), the Dutch broadcaster, would send to the inaugural Eurovision Song Contest in Lugano, Switzerland. The final was held on 24 April 1956.

Before Eurovision

Nationaal Songfestival 1956 
The final was held on 24 April 1956 at the AVRO TV Studios in Hilversum, hosted by Karin Kraaykamp. The songs were ranked by postcard voting. The top two songs were "Voorgoed voorbij", written and composed by Jelle de Vries, and "De vogels van Holland", written by Annie M. G. Schmidt and composed by Cor Lemaire.

At Eurovision 
There were seven participating countries, and each was drawn to perform two songs in the same order via two rounds, with Netherlands performing first in each round, making "" the first song performed in the Eurovision Song Contest history, and the first of many to sing the praises of the singer's homeland. According to Des Mangan this song set the tone for the Eurovision tradition of nonsensical lyrics, although he admits that there are other contenders for such a claim as well. "" opened the second round, performing eighth, after Italy.

Both of the Dutch entries were conducted at the contest by the musical director Fernando Paggi and preceded host country . The final votes of the first contest were never announced, so it is not known what place the songs finished at the actual Eurovision Song Contest. Simon Barclay, in The Complete and Independent Guide to the Eurovision Song Contest 2010, claims that "The vogels van Holland" finished second. The two were succeeded as Dutch representative at the 1957 contest again by Corry Brokken with "".

References

External links
Dutch National Final page

1956
Countries in the Eurovision Song Contest 1956
Eurovision